Ejaita Ifoni (born 13 February 2000) is a Nigerian footballer who plays as a forward for Belgian side Seraing.

Club career
Born in Delta State, Nigeria, Ifoni moved to Mozambique and played for Costa do Sol, Chibuto and Black Bulls. He became top scorer in the 2020–21 Moçambola, with seventeen goals in fourteen games.

In January 2022, he moved to Portugal to sign for the 'B' team of FC Porto.

On 20 July 2022, Ifoni signed a three-season contract with Seraing in Belgium.

Career statistics

Club

Notes

References

2000 births
Living people
Nigerian footballers
Association football forwards
Moçambola players
Liga Portugal 2 players
Belgian Pro League players
CD Costa do Sol players
FC Chibuto players
FC Porto players
FC Porto B players
R.F.C. Seraing (1922) players
Nigerian expatriate footballers
Nigerian expatriate sportspeople in Mozambique
Expatriate footballers in Mozambique
Nigerian expatriate sportspeople in Portugal
Expatriate footballers in Portugal
Nigerian expatriate sportspeople in Belgium
Expatriate footballers in Belgium